Bladast or Bladastes was a Frankish dux during the reigns of Chilperic I and Chlothar II. 

In 583 or 581, Chilperic I gave the province of Aquitaine to Bladast and Desiderius and sent them into Vasconia with the Aquitainian army. They were defeated.

Notes

Sources
Gregory of Tours. Historia Francorum. translated Earnest Brehaut, 1916. 
Lewis, Archibald R. "The Dukes in the Regnum Francorum, A.D. 550-751." Speculum, Vol. 51, No 3 (July 1976), pp 381–410.
Collins, Roger. "The Basques in Aquitaine and Navarre: Problems of Frontier Government." War and Society in the Middle Ages: Essays in Honour of J. O. Prestwich. edd. J. Gillingham and J. C. Holt. Cambridge: Boydell Press, 1984. Reprinted in Law, Culture and Regionalism in Early Medieval Spain. Variorum, 1992. .

Dukes of Aquitaine